Oy vey is a Yiddish phrase expressing dismay or exasperation. Also spelled oy vay, oy veh, or oi vey, and often abbreviated to oy, the expression may be translated as "oh, woe!" or "woe is me!" Its Hebrew equivalent is oy vavoy.

Derivation

According to etymologist Douglas Harper, the phrase is derived from Yiddish and is of Germanic origin. It is cognate with the German expression o weh, or auweh, combining the German and Dutch exclamation au! meaning "ouch/oh" and the German word Weh, a cognate of the English word woe (as well as the Dutch wee meaning pain). The expression is also related to oh ve, an older expression in Danish and Swedish, and oy wah, an expression used with a similar meaning in the Montbéliard region in France. The Latin equivalent is heu, vae!; a more standard expression would be o, me miserum, or heu, me miserum.

According to Chabad.org, an alternative theory for the origin of the Yiddish expression is that "oy" stems from Biblical Hebrew, and that "vey" is its Aramaic equivalent. It is alternatively spelled אוי, הוי, or הו in Biblical Hebrew  and ווי, וי, ואי, and ויא in Aramaic.  The term is occasionally doubled, as הו הו in Amos 5:16 and וי וי in Targum Pseudo-Jonathan on that verse, but two versions were never combined classically.

Significance

The expression is often abbreviated to simply oy, or elongated to oy vey iz mir ("Oh, woe is me"). The fuller lament is sometimes found as the more Germanic oy vey ist mir. The main purpose or effect of elongating it is often dramatic, something like a "cosmic ouch". Oy is not merely an ordinary word, but rather expresses an entire world view, according to visual anthropologist Penny Wolin. Its meaning is approximately opposite that of mazel tov.
A related expression is oy gevalt, which can have a similar meaning, or also express shock or amazement.

See also
List of English words of Yiddish origin
Oi (interjection), a similar-sounding British English exclamation, said to also have older European origins

References

External links

Yiddish words and phrases